Julius Williams (born July 19, 1986) is a former American football defensive lineman. He last played for the Las Vegas Outlaws of the Arena Football League (AFL). He was signed by the Jacksonville Jaguars as an undrafted free agent in 2009. He played college football at Connecticut.
 
Williams has also been a member of the Hartford Colonials.

Professional career
Williams signed with the Jacksonville Jaguars in the spring of 2009 and was one of only two undrafted free agents to make the opening day roster. As a rookie, he was active for 11 games and started one contest at defensive end. He was released by Jacksonville at the final cut down in 2010 and joined Hartford of the UFL for the final weeks of that league's inaugural season.

Williams signed with the Edmonton Eskimos on April 1, 2011. He began the season on the 1-game injured list with a dislocated elbow. He was activated for Game 4 and in 15 games (15 starts) had 20 defensive tackles, 5 quarterback sacks and a tackle for a loss. Julius also started the Western Semi-Final (1 defensive tackle and a quarterback sack) and the Western Final (1 defensive tackle).

On May 15, 2014, Williams was assigned to the San Jose SaberCats of the Arena Football League (AFL). On June 2, 2014, Williams was traded to the Philadelphia Soul in exchange for Duke Robinson.

On December 22, 2014, Williams was selected by the Las Vegas Outlaws with the 4th pick of the 2014 Expansion Draft.

On May 8th, 2015, Williams retired from professional football.

References

External links
 Edmonton Eskimos bio

1986 births
Living people
American football defensive ends
UConn Huskies football players
Edmonton Elks players
Hartford Colonials players
Jacksonville Jaguars players
People from Decatur, Georgia
University of Connecticut alumni
BC Lions players
San Jose SaberCats players
Sportspeople from DeKalb County, Georgia
Las Vegas Outlaws (arena football) players
Philadelphia Soul players